CB-13 (CRA13, SAB-378) is a cannabinoid drug, which acts as a potent agonist at both the CB1 and CB2 receptors, but has poor blood–brain barrier penetration, and so produces only peripheral effects at low doses, with symptoms of central effects such as catalepsy only appearing at much higher dose ranges. It has antihyperalgesic properties in animal studies, and has progressed to preliminary human trials.

Legal Status

As of October 2015 CB-13 is a controlled substance in China.

See also
 AM-6545
 AZ-11713908

References

Cannabinoids
Designer drugs
Naphthalenes
Aromatic ketones
Naphthol ethers
Peripherally selective drugs
Ethers